Say My Name is a 2018 comedy film directed by Jay Stern and written by Deborah Frances-White. It starred Lisa Brenner, Nick Blood and Mark Bonnar and was released on 14 October 2018  at the Liverpool International Film Festival.

Cast
 Lisa Brenner as Mary Page
 Nick Blood as Statton Taylor
 Celyn Jones as Kipper Jones
 Mark Bonnar as Dec
 Alan Cox as Father Donald Davies
 Peter Davison as Rich Herbig
 Jamie de Courcey as Officer Sedgwick

Release
The film was released on 14 October 2018 at the Liverpool International Film Festival.

References

External links
 

British comedy films
2010s British films